= Caron Rawnsley =

Caron Rawnsley is an Irish conservationist, noted for cleaning Indian restoring stepwells of Jodhpur.
